Ponta do Leme Velho is a headland on the southeast coast of the island of Sal, Cape Verde. It is about 2 km east of the town of Santa Maria.

References

Santa Maria, Cape Verde
Leme Velho
Geography of Sal, Cape Verde